Sorella is the Italian word for sister. It may also refer to:

Sorella eminibey, a synonym of the Chestnut sparrow
Thérèse Ansingh,  Dutch artist (1883-1968) who used Sorella as a pseudonym

See also
Sorella Englund (born 1945), Finnish and Danish ballet dancer
Mus sorella, a species of mouse